Rauhala is a Finnish surname. Notable people with the surname include:

Jukka Rauhala (born 1959), Finnish Olympic wrestler
Kalervo Rauhala (1930–2016), Finnish Olympic wrestler, uncle of Jukka and Pekka 
Leena Rauhala, Finnish politician 
Otto Rauhala (born 1995), Finnish ice hockey player
Pekka Rauhala (born 1960), Finnish Olympic wrestler 

Finnish-language surnames